Rollerboys Recordings is a Swedish independent record label founded by Yourhighness, Elias Raam and Måns Ericson. 
Rollerboys Recordings originated from Club Rollerboys, and started releasing records in 2007 with Bogdan Irkük a.k.a. BULGARI's "The Distant EP".

The label's focus is on modern disco music, a multi-faceted output ranging from electro to house to italo. All releases to date have been approved by the Swedish Epic Disco Association (S.E.D.A.).

The releases have received wide critical acclaim, and have been licensed to a multitude of compilations.

Discography

Discography from Discogs

Compilations

 Future Disco "Motorcycle Theme (Fabrizio Mammarella Edit)" - Motorcycle Boy (Azuli, 2009)
 Second Royal Vol. 4 "Klee" - Ultracity (2009)
 Nu Balearica by Fred Deakin "Space Reflecting On The Bosporos" - Bogdan Irkük a.k.a. BULGARI  (Ministry Of Sound, 2008)
 Body Language Vol.5 by Chateau Flight "The Distant Message(Arken Remix)" - Bogdan Irkük a.k.a. BULGARI (Get Physical, 2007)

Artists

 Ultracity
 Bogdan Irkük a.k.a. BULGARI
 Ilya Santana
 Motorcycle Boy
 Fabrizio Mammarella

References

External links
 Rollerboys Recordings on Myspace

Swedish independent record labels
Electronic dance music record labels
Electronic music record labels